HMS Charles has been the name of more than one ship of the English or British Royal Navy:

 , a 16-gun pinnace launched in 1586 and sold in 1616
 , a 16-gun pinnace built in 1620 and last listed in 1627
 , a 44-gun ship launched in 1632, renamed HMS Liberty in 1649, and wrecked in 1650
 , a 38-gun ship captured in 1649, renamed Guinea in 1649, and sold in 1667
 , a royal yacht launched in 1662 and transferred to the Ordnance Office in 1668
 , a 6-gun fireship purchased in 1666 and sold in 1667
 , a 96-gun first rate launched in 1668, renamed  in 1687, and scrapped in 1774
 , an 8-gun royal yacht launched in 1675 and wrecked in 1678
 , a 6-gun fireship purchased in 1688 and expended in 1695

See also
 
 HM 
 HM hired armed schooner  (1811-1814)